is a Japanese footballer who plays for Vonds Ichihara.

Club statistics
Updated to 31 December 2020.

Honours
 Blaublitz Akita
 J3 League (1): 2020

References

External links

Profile at Tokyo Verdy
Profile at YSCC Yokohama

1991 births
Living people
Nippon Sport Science University alumni
People from Tama, Tokyo
Association football people from Tokyo Metropolis
Japanese people of Venezuelan descent
Japanese footballers
J2 League players
J3 League players
Tokyo Verdy players
YSCC Yokohama players
Blaublitz Akita players
Vonds Ichihara players
Association football forwards